Gérard Herter, also known as Gerhard Haerter, Gerard Haerther, Gerald Herter, Gerard Herter, and Gerhard Herter (born 12 April 1920 in Stuttgart, died 6 February 2007 in Munich) was a German actor of the 1950s and 1960s who played many villains, especially Prussian types, in Spaghetti Westerns. He made his film debut in Caltiki - il mostro immortale in 1959. His last credited appearance was in Ludwig in 1972.

Filmography

External links
 

1920 births
2007 deaths
Male actors from Stuttgart
German male film actors
Male Spaghetti Western actors